Joppa is a village in Massac County, Illinois, United States, along the Ohio River. The population was 350 as of the 2020 census. It is part of the Paducah, KY-IL Micropolitan Statistical Area.

History
During the first part of the 19th century, a riverboat landing known as Copeland's Landing operated at what is now Joppa. In the early 1870s, A.J. Kuykendall, a prominent local land owner, and Jesse Baccus, who operated a local sawmill, decided to establish a town. They named the town after the Biblical city of Joppa (in modern Israel).  After the arrival of the railroad in 1900, the village thrived for several years as a river-to-rail transloading station.  Joppa incorporated in 1901. Joppa has since lost a lot of population and stores, now only having a school and a few hundred people living there.

Geography
Joppa is located in western Massac County at  (37.207399, -88.843033). The village lies along the Ohio River downstream from Metropolis, Illinois, and Paducah, Kentucky. County Road 5 connects Joppa with U.S. Route 45 near Metropolis to the east. The Joppa Generating Station, a coal and natural gas power plant operated by Electric Energy, Inc., lies just west of the village.

Demographics

2010
According to the 2010 U.S. Census Bureau, 360 persons lived in the village:
89.2% White; 85.8% White, non-Hispanic
8.6% Black
0.6% Native American
0.0% Asian 
0.0% Native Hawaiian or Pacific Islander 
1.7% Two or more races
0.0% Other races 
3.3% Hispanic or Latino (all White)

2000
In 2000, there were 409 people, 165 households, and 110 families residing in the village. The racial makeup of the village was 88.26% White, 7.58% African American, 0.24% Native American, 0.98% from other races, and 2.93% from two or more races. Hispanic or Latino of any race were 2.44% of the population.

There were 165 households, out of which 32.1% had children under the age of 18 living with them, 48.5% were married couples living together, 12.7% had a female householder with no husband present, and 33.3% were non-families. 28.5% of all households were made up of individuals, and 8.5% had someone living alone who was 65 years of age or older. The average household size was 2.48 and the average family size was 3.09.

In the village, the population was spread out, with 27.6% under the age of 18, 8.3% from 18 to 24, 24.4% from 25 to 44, 26.9% from 45 to 64, and 12.7% who were 65 years of age or older. The median age was 36 years. For every 100 females, there were 109.7 males. For every 100 females age 18 and over, there were 96.0 males.

The median income for a household in the village was $17,813, and the median income for a family was $20,729. Males had a median income of $23,750 versus $16,607 for females. The per capita income for the village was $8,890. About 34.3% of families and 44.6% of the population were below the poverty line, including 65.1% of those under age 18 and 20.0% of those age 65 or over.

See also
List of cities and towns along the Ohio River

References

External links

Villages in Massac County, Illinois
Villages in Illinois
Paducah micropolitan area
Illinois populated places on the Ohio River